The United Nations Integrated Peacebuilding Office in Guinea-Bissau (UNIOGBIS) is a United Nations peacebuilding mission in Guinea-Bissau.

It was established by Resolution 1876 of the United Nations Security Council in 2009 and succeeded the United Nations Peacebuilding Support Office in Guinea-Bissau (UNOGBIS). It is tasked with promoting stability in the country.

See also
 History of Guinea-Bissau

References

External links
UNIOGBIS website

Guinea-Bissau
History of Guinea-Bissau
1876
2009 establishments in Africa
Guinea-Bissau and the United Nations